Alfredo Sampaio Filho (7 February 1927 – 4 April 2017), known as Alfredinho, was a Brazilian retired football manager and player. He played as a right winger.

Honours

Player
Santos
Campeonato Paulista: 1955, 1956
Torneio Rio – São Paulo: 1959

Grêmio
Campeonato Gaúcho: 1957

References

1927 births
2017 deaths
Sportspeople from Ceará
Brazilian footballers
Association football wingers
Ceará Sporting Club players
Sampaio Corrêa Futebol Clube players
Clube do Remo players
Madureira Esporte Clube players
Sociedade Esportiva Palmeiras players
Clube Atlético Linense players
Santos FC players
Grêmio Foot-Ball Porto Alegrense players
Esporte Clube XV de Novembro (Piracicaba) players
Comercial Futebol Clube (Ribeirão Preto) players
Brazilian football managers
Comercial Futebol Clube (Ribeirão Preto) managers
Guarani FC managers
Botafogo Futebol Clube (SP) managers
Paulista Futebol Clube managers
Marília Atlético Clube managers
Santos FC managers
Esporte Clube Noroeste managers
Associação Atlética Internacional (Limeira) managers
Associação Atlética Francana managers
Rio Preto Esporte Clube managers
Clube Atlético Taquaritinga managers
Santos FC non-playing staff